The Cijin Wind Turbine Park, Cijin Wind Power Park or Cijin Windmill Park is a recreational wind farm in Cijin District, Kaohsiung, Taiwan.

Generation
The park consists of seven 3-blade wind turbines which generate enough power to provide the park with four hours of illumination during night time.

Features
The park also has coastal plants, lawn, viewing platform and a performance square.

See also

 Renewable energy in Taiwan
 Electricity sector in Taiwan
 List of tourist attractions in Taiwan

References

Buildings and structures in Kaohsiung
Wind farms in Taiwan